The Mongolia Charity Rally is the charity rally from London to the capital of Mongolia, Ulaanbaatar. The Mongolia Charity Rally is organised by Charity Rallies, part of Go Help, a UK-based charity.

Adventure 
Participants start the  trip from a Mongolian Naadam festival in London, England. The vehicles are then driven to Ulaanbaatar, Mongolia, where they are donated to a partner charity of Go Help for auction. Charity Ralliers must raise a minimum of £1,500 for UK charity Go Help, that runs Charity Rallies, through Go Help's JustGiving page, before departing. The main beneficiary of the 2008 and 2009 Mongolia Charity Rally was Save the Children.

The Mongolia Charity Rally launches from Highbury Fields in Islington, London. Go Help and the Mongolian Association organise a Mongolian Naadam to see Charity Ralliers off on their adventure, an event that is heavily attended by the Mongolian community in London, and was featured on ITV Local, a UK television network.

Routes 
The main routes to Mongolia are either the Northern Route, from London to Mongolia via Moscow, or the Southern Route, via Turkmenistan, Uzbekistan, Kazakhstan and Russia.

Entry fees 
The Mongolia Charity Rally charges an entry fee that is aimed at covering the costs of running the event. All excess funds that are generated from entry fees are donated to a project started by Go Help that provides riding helmets to child jockeys taking part in Mongolian Naadam festivals, a project that was covered by Mongolian television in 2008. The entry fee for the Mongolia Charity Rally 2010 is £300 for teams signing up before October 1, after which the invitation is by invitation only. The entry fee for 2009 was also £300, which is less than half the entry fee of £650 charged in 2009 by a competing rally run by a profit making company. The 2008 entry fee was £150. The increase reflected two major additions to Go Help's budget: the hiring of an employee in Mongolia to oversee vehicle sales and to monitor the application of funds raised by Charity Ralliers, and the costs of full-time development of the Charity Rallies website.

See also
Charity rally
Mongol Rally

References

Press Coverage of the Mongolia Charity Rally 
 Mongolia Charity Rally helps Save the Children - UB Post
 Students in Mongolia mission - Lancaster Guardian
 In the steps of Ghenghis Khan - Bromsgrove Advertiser
 Pink Ladies in Mongolia Rally - Combedown Liberal Democrats Blog
 Goodbye to Volvo via Mongolia - Wilts and Gloucestershire Standard
 Children’s Charities to Benefit from Policemens' Big Challenge - Kent Online
 Car trek pair are forced to take taxi
 Car trek pair are back on the road after car repairs
  Charlie in mercy mission to Mongolia

Automotive events
Rally competitions in Mongolia
Road rallying
Sport in Mongolia
Motorsport in Asia